Plug 1 & Plug 2 Present... First Serve is the eighth album from hip-hop group De La Soul members Kelvin Mercer (a.k.a. Plug 1), and David Jolicoeur (a.k.a. Plug 2), in collaboration with French DJ duo Chokolate and Khalid, released on April 3, 2012.

In the album the duo adopt the persona of "First Serve" a hip-hop band making it in the music industry in the late 1990s. Mercer takes the persona of "Jacob 'Pop Life' Barrow", and Jolicoeur takes the persona of "Deen Witter". The album details the fictional band making it in the music industry, their success, breakup, and eventual reformation.

Jolicoeur and Mercer have been interviewed in character as Barrow and Witter, often quoting De La Soul as an "influence", and describing De La Soul as "those guys".

Track listing

References 

2012 albums
De La Soul albums